Dalun may refer to the following locations:

 Dalun, Guangxi (大伦镇), town in Beiliu, Guangxi, China
 Dalun, Jiangsu (大伦镇), town in Jiangyan, Jiangsu, China
 Dalan, Khuzestan, also romanised Dālūn, village in Bagh-e Malek County, Khuzestan Province, Iran
 Dalun, Kohgiluyeh and Boyer-Ahmad (دالون – Dālūn), village in Kohgiluyeh County, Kohgiluyeh and Boyer-Ahmad Province, Iran